Nurtepe is an underground station on the M7 line of the Istanbul Metro in Kağıthane. The station is located on Sokollu Street in the Nurtepe neighborhood of Kağıthane.

The station has a total of 3 entrances, the entrance number 1 is Nurtepe Mosque, entrance number 2 is Sokollu Street/Zühre Street and entrance number 3 is Hacı Ethem Üktem Primary School.

The M7 line operates as fully automatic unattended train operation (UTO). The station consists of an island platform with two tracks. Since the M7 is an ATO line, protective gates on each side of the platform open only when a train is in the station.

Connection to IETT city buses is available from at street level.

Nurtepe station was opened on 28 October 2020. The station was built between Alibeyköy Creek and Kâğıthane Creek.

Station layout

Operation information 
As of 2021, total length of M7 line is 18 km. The line operates between 06.00 - 00.00 and travel frequency is 6 minutes at peak hour.

References

External links 

 Official Website of Istanbul Metro (in English)

Railway stations opened in 2020
Istanbul metro stations
Kağıthane
2020 establishments in Turkey